The Robert H. Smith class of destroyer minelayers was built by the United States during World War II. The class was named for naval officer Robert H. Smith.

These vessels were all originally laid down as s and converted during construction in 1944. In that time the United States produced twelve Robert H. Smith-class destroyer minelayers. Their original hull numbers were DD-735-40, 749-51, and 771-73. None of the Robert H. Smith-class vessels ever laid a mine in wartime, though they were frequently employed in minesweeping. Minelayers did not carry torpedo tubes. Otherwise they were used interchangeably with other destroyer types. As radar pickets at Okinawa, Aaron Ward, Lindsey, and J. William Ditter were damaged by kamikazes, and Shea by a Baka bomb. Five of the class served actively in the 1950s, but all survivors were mothballed by the end of the decade and were disposed of in the 1970s. None of this class received FRAM conversions.

Ships in class

References

Sources
 Friedman, Norman "US Destroyers: An Illustrated Design History (Revised Edition)", Naval Institute Press, Annapolis:2004, .
 Gardiner, Robert and Chesneau, Roger, Conway's All the World's Fighting Ships 1922–1946, Conway Maritime Press, 1980. .
 Silverstone, Paul H., U.S. Warships of World War II (Ian Allan, 1965),

External links 

 Robert H. Smith-class destroyer minelayers in World War II
 NavSource Destroyer Photo Page
 DiGiulian, Tony Navweaps.com US Navy mines page

Destroyer classes